Alexis Heraclides (born 1952 in Alexandria) is a Greek academic and public intellectual (son of ambassador Dimitris Heraclides and dentist Zina Ficardo), and from 2004 until 2019 professor of International Relations and conflict resolution at the Panteion University of Social and Political Sciences (Athens). He is now emeritus professor of Panteion University and continuous to be active as an academic (see below books written after his retirement) and as a public intellectual. Previously he served as counselor on minorities and human rights in the Greek foreign ministry (1983-1997) and in that capacity participated in a number of norm-setting intergovernmental conferences on human rights and minorities, notably in the context of the CSCE (Conference on Security and Co-operation in Europe). He was also appointed alternate expert of the UN Sub-Commission on Prevention of Discrimination and Protection of Minorities (UN Commission on Human Rights) (1990-1992).

Education

He studied political science and International Relations at Panteion, and at the University of London (M.Sc. at University College, under John W. Burton) and at the University of Kent (Ph.D. under A.J.R. Groom). His main publications cover intervention in secessionist conflicts, secession and self-determination, ethnicity and nationalism, the CSCE, perceptions in foreign policy and specific conflicts mainly from a conflict resolution perspective, such as Kosovo, Southern Sudan, the Kurdish question, the Israeli-Palestinian conflict, the Cyprus problem and the Greek-Turkish conflict. His more recent publications are on humanitarian intervention in the long nineteenth century, just war theory, the Macedonian Question, human rights and the problem of cultural relativism, Liberal Islam and human rights, and the history of Greek-Albanian relations.

Writings
He has written nine books in English and fifteen in Greek, including:
The Self-Determination of Minorities in International Politics (London: Frank Cass, 1991).
The Arab-Israeli Conflict: The Problèmatique of Peaceful Resolution (Athens: Papazissis, 1991) [in Greek].
Security and Co-operation in Europe: The Human Dimension, 1972-1992 (London: Frank Cass, 1993).
Helsinki-II and its Aftermath: The Making of the CSCE into an International Organization (London: Pinter, 1993).
Greece and the “Threat from the East” (Athens: Polis, 2001) [in Greek], also published in Turkey as Yunanistan ve “Dogu’dan Gelen Tehlike” Turkiye: *Turk-Yunan Iliskilerinde Cikmazlar ve Cozum Yollari (Istanbul: Iletişim, 2002).
International Society and the Theories of International Relations: A Critical Survey (Athens: I.Sideris, 2000) [in Greek].
The Cyprus Question: Conflict and Resolution (Athens: I. Sideris, 2002) [in Greek].
The Cyprus Problem, 1947-2004: From Union to Partition? (Athens: I.Sideris, 2006) [in Greek].
Irreconcilable Νeighbors: Greece-Turkey. The Aegean Dispute (Athens: I.Sideris, 2007) [in Greek]. 
The Greek-Turkish Conflict in the Aegean: Imagined Enemies (Basingstoke: Palgrave-Macmillan, 2010).
The Evolution of International Society (Athens: I.Sideris, 2012) [in Greek]. 
with Ada Dialla, Humanitarian Intervention in the Long Nineteenth Century: Setting the Precedent (Manchester: Manchester University Press, 2015).
National Issues and Ethnocentrism: A Critique of Greek Foreign Policy (Athens: I. Sideris, 2018) [in Greek].
The Macedonian Question 1878-1918: From National Claims to Conflicting National Identities (Athens: Themelio, 2018) [in Greek].
editor with Gizem Alioglu Cakmak, Greece and Turkey in Conflict and Cooperation: From Europeanization to De-Europenalization (Abingdon: Routledge, 2019).
Just War and Humanitarian Intervention: A History in the International Ethics of War (Athens: I.Sideris, 2020). 
The Macedonian Question and the Macedonians: A History (Abingdon: Routledge, 2021).

Scientific contributions
His main scientific contributions to date are with regard to intervention in secessionist conflicts,  the reasons for separatism,  secession and self-determination,  human rights norm-setting in the CSCE process,  the Cyprus problem,  the Greek-Turkish conflict in the Aegean  and the history of humanitarian intervention.

Political activity
As counselor on human rights and minorities in the Greek foreign ministry he was instrumental in the amelioration of the Greek policy towards the Muslim/Turkish minority in Thrace and in the abandonment of the negative Greek policy on minority rights in international forums.

He has written hundreds of articles in Greek dailies and magazines (many of which have been republished in Greek Cypriot and Turkish newspapers) on minority issues, the resolution of the Cyprus problem (via a loose consociational bicommunal federation), the amelioration of Greek-Turkish relations and the comprehensive settlement of the pending Aegean dispute, the settlement of the vexing “Macedonian Question” between Athens and Skopje (the name of “Macedonia”), and on Greek and Greek-Cypriot nationalism. On these issues he has also participated within various NGOs in Greece and Cyprus (The Front for Reason against Nationalism, Centre of Minority Groups, Cyprus Academic Dialogue and others).  In 1997 he was awarded the Abdi Ipekçi Peace and Friendship Prize for his newspaper articles on the resolution of the Greek-Turkish conflict. His repeated criticism of nationalism in Greece and in the Republic of Cyprus has earned him the opprobrium of key nationalist figures in both countries, and he has been repeatedly attacked in the conservative Greek and Greek Cypriot press, TV and the web, and by ultra-nationalist political parties (inter alia in the Greek Parliament) from the mid-1990s until today.

References

1952 births
People from Alexandria
Living people
Alumni of University College London
Panteion University alumni
Alumni of the University of London
Greek political scientists
International relations scholars
Greece–Turkey relations